Phaansi Ke Baad is a 1985 Indian Hindi-language thriller film directed and produced by Harmesh Malhotra. This film was released on 25 January 1985 under the banner of Eastern Films. The music direction of the film was by Anu Malik, and the songs are written by Anand Bakshi.

Plot
Vijay is a government advocate with a high success rate. He is popular and well known in court due to his efficiency. The story starts with a murder case where the accused, Abbas, is tried and found guilty. Swapna, Vijay's girlfriend, suddenly discovers new evidence that Abbas may not be the real culprit then Vijay starts a secret investigation while defending Abbas in his trial. Before the trial's completion the police arrest Vijay for another murder.

Cast
 Shatrughan Sinha as Vijay
 Hema Malini as Sapna
 Ajit as DIG Surendranath
 Shakti Kapoor as Abbas
 Amrish Puri as Damodar
 Iftekhar as Mohammed Riaz
 Urmila Bhatt as Sapna's Mother
 Jagdeep as Jaggi
 Madhu Malhotra as Neena
 Satyen Kappu as Sukhdev Walia
 Manik Irani as Montha

Songs

References

External links
 

1985 films
1980s Hindi-language films
Indian crime thriller films
Films directed by Harmesh Malhotra
Films scored by Anu Malik
1980s crime thriller films